AgroParisTech (officially Institut des sciences et industries du vivant et de l'environnement, or Paris Institute of Technology for Life, Food and Environmental Sciences) is a French higher education institution, known as a grande école. It is a constituent member of the Paris-Saclay University. It was founded on January 1, 2007, by the merger of three life sciences grandes écoles (INA P-G, ENGREF and ENSIA).

Leader in life sciences and agronomy, AgroParisTech is one of the foremost and most prestigious Grandes Écoles. AgroParisTech is one of the founding members of the Université Paris-Saclay, which will be the largest European multidisciplinary campus. AgroParisTech will consequently be moving to the Paris-Saclay business and research-intensive cluster in 2021.

AgroParisTech is a part of the Paris-Saclay University and a member of the Paris Institute of Technology (ParisTech). The latter is a consortium of ten graduate institutes of science and engineering. AgroParisTech is also part of 'The Life and Environmental Science and Technology Hub' of the Paris region, together with INRAE, Cemagref, AFSSA, École nationale vétérinaire d'Alfort and the Versailles National School of Landscape architecture.

History
AgroParisTech is the merger of three graduate institutes of science and engineering located around Paris:
 Institut National Agronomique Paris-Grignon (INA P-G), founded in 1826
 École nationale du génie rural, des eaux et des forêts (ENGREF), founded in 1964
 École Nationale Supérieure des Industries Agricoles et Alimentaires (ENSIA), founded in 1893.

The public higher education system in France includes universities and other institutions called the grande école. The grandes écoles are the best rated pathways for higher education in Engineering and Management. The vast majority of the chief executives in major French companies and of top managers in the French Administration are graduates from the grandes écoles. The features are:
 A very selective admission process through which students are either admitted by a nationwide entrance exam (notably after two or three years of prépas) or by the virtue of excellent academic records
 5 years (Master’s degrees) to 8 years (PhD and post-Master’s degrees) of higher education
 The degree course at the grandes écoles includes compulsory internships in laboratories and companies, in France or abroad
 The prestige of the grandes écoles and contacts with major enterprises provide an easy access to the job market
The university includes a museum, which has objects on loan from institutions in Wallis and Futuna, such as Uvea Museum Association, including a coca cola bottle dating to 1942.

Organization
AgroParisTech is organized into five departments:
 Agronomy, Forestry, Water and Environmental Science and Technology,
 Life Science and Health,
 Science and Engineering for Food and Bioproducts,
 Social science, Economics and Management,
 Modeling: Mathematics, Informatics and Physics

Academic programs
AgroParisTech offers different Masters:
 3 different Masters of Engineering (MEng):
 Agronomy
 Food Science and Engineering
 Forestry
 2 Masters of Science (MSc)
 1 Master's program with 5 domains that cover most fields of Life Science and Technology
 one of 7 partner universities in the Master of Science in European Forestry program

It also offers:
 a wide range of Ph.D. programs.
 1 Post-Master's degree for Management and Administration in environmental sciences and policies, proposed by ENGREF, a post-graduate institute of AgroParisTech.
 9 Post-master professional certificates (one-year post graduate training)

Research programmes
AgroParisTech has:
 39 research laboratories,
 300 researchers

See also
 National School of Rural Engineering, Water Resources and Forestry
 French National School of Forestry
 Agrocampus Ouest
 SupAgro

References

External links
 Official website 
 Official website 

ParisTech
Agronomy schools
Forestry education
Engineering universities and colleges in France
Universities and colleges in Paris
Forestry in France
Grandes écoles
Educational institutions established in 2007
2007 establishments in France
Paris-Saclay
Paris-Saclay University